Intemperance may refer to:

 The lack of temperance, a religious concept
 Alcohol intoxication